Gandhi Smarak Road railway station is a small railway station in Akola district, Maharashtra. Its code is GSX. The station consists of one platform. The platform is not well sheltered. It lacks many facilities including water and sanitation.

Trains 
Some of the trains that run from Gandhi Smarak Road are:
 Akola–Mhow MG Passenger (unreserved)
 Akola–Mhow MG Fast Passenger

References

Railway stations in Akola district
Nanded railway division